The Arab Democratic Union Party ( - Hizb Al-Ittihad Al-'Arabi Al-Dimuqrati) is a nationalist political party in Syria. It is part of the National Progressive Front of legally licensed parties which support the socialist and Arab nationalist orientation of the government and accept the leadership of the Ba'ath Party. In the 22 April 2007 People's Council of Syria election the party was awarded 1 out of 250 seats in the parliament.

Ideology
The party is committed to the ideals of Nasserism, the party states its intent as, "Building a society that is governed by social justice and in its ideological approach and its struggle is guided by Nasserism, thought and practice". The party is both Arab nationalist and Arab socialist.

References

Arab nationalism in Syria
Nationalist parties in Syria
Nasserist political parties
Political parties in Syria
Political parties with year of disestablishment missing
Socialist parties in Syria